Duty Is Duty is a 1931 German comedy film directed by Carl Boese and starring Fritz Spira, Ralph Arthur Roberts, and Maly Delschaft.

Cast
 Fritz Spira as General von Hessendorf
 Ralph Arthur Roberts as Major von Koppel
 Maly Delschaft as Ilse, seine Frau
 Heinrich Fuchs as Leutnant Tübinger, Adjutant
 Herbert Kiper as Leutnant der Res., Dr. Neumann
 Ernst Rückert as Wachtmeister Krell
 Fritz Schulz as Kaczmarek
 Lucie Englisch as Anna
 Berthe Ostyn as Carola Hopkins, Soubrette
 Hugo Fischer-Köppe as Schani Hofer, Komiker
 Ernst Behmer as Pepi Tagsommer, Friseur

References

Bibliography 
 James Robert Parish & Kingsley Canham. Film Directors Guide: Western Europe. Scarecrow Press, 1976.

External links 
 

1931 films
1931 comedy films
German comedy films
Films of the Weimar Republic
1930s German-language films
Films directed by Carl Boese
Military humor in film
German black-and-white films
1930s German films